In economics and finance, the profit rate is the relative profitability of an investment project, a capitalist enterprise or a whole capitalist economy. It is similar to the concept of rate of return on investment.

Historical cost vs. market value
The rate of profit depends on the definition of capital invested. Two measurements of the value of capital exist: capital at historical cost and capital at market value. Historical cost is the original cost of an asset at the time of purchase or payment.  Market value is the re-sale value, replacement value, or value in present or alternative use. 

To compute the rate of profit, replacement cost of capital assets must be used to define the capital cost.  Assets such as machinery cannot be replaced at their historical cost, but must be purchased at the current market value. When inflation occurs, historical cost would not take account of rising prices of equipment. The rate of profit would be overestimated, using lower historical cost for computing the value of capital invested. 

On the other side, due to technical progress, products tend to become cheaper. This in itself should, theoretically, raise rates of profit, because replacement cost declines.

A prisoner's dilemma

If, however, firms achieve higher sales per worker the more they invest per worker, they will try to increase investments per worker as long as this raises their rate of profit. If some capitalists do this, all capitalists must do it, because those who do not will fall behind in competition. 

This, however, means that replacement cost of capital per worker invested, now calculated at the replacement cost necessary to keep up with the competition, tends to be increased by firms more so than sales per worker before. This squeeze, that investments per worker tend to be driven up by competition more so than before sales per worker have been increased, causes the tendency of the rate of profit to fall. Thus, capitalists are caught in a prisoner's dilemma or rationality trap. 

This "new" rate of profit (r'), which tends to fall, would be measured as 

 r' = (surplus-value)/(capital to be invested for the next period of production in order to remain competitive).

Numerical example
At the beginning of a "year" (possibly another length of time period, in this case other numerical values will arise) the capitalist has to invest an amount of capital. 

For example, he must invest: 
100 € for wages (variable capital v)
Furthermore he must invest for constant capital c:
100 € for “production material”
100 € for “instruments” (life span 2 years)
100 € for “machines” (life span 4 years)
100 € for “equipment” (life span infinity).
In total he invests at the beginning of the year 500 €.

Now, it is assumed that during the year the capitalist can produce and sell commodities at a total price of 300 €. Volume of sales, therefore, is 300 €. 

From volume of sales costs of the year must be deducted. Costs of circulating capital are expenses for “production material” and for labour power, both of them are consumed in production during the year (that is the definition of “circulating capital”):
100 € wage costs (variable capital) – see assumption above.
100 € expenses for material – see assumption above.
costs of fixed capital (depreciation).
Fixed capital are those means of production, which are in use for more than one year: The capitalist must take into account, that “instruments” and “machines” do not live forever, but must finally be replaced after usage. From sales he must take aside certain sums of money (depreciation) to be able to replace “instruments” and “machines” at their end of life. For “instruments”, the depreciation expense per year is 50 € (100 € purchase cost divided by lifespan of 2 years, straight-line depreciation assumed) and for “machines” 25 € (100 € purchase cost divided by 4 years). For “equipment” there is no depreciation expense, because, in this example, it is assumed that equipment holds forever, there is no wear and tear for equipment.

In total, costs are 275 €.

Sales of 300 € minus costs of 275 € gives a profit of 25 €. 25 € in relation to an initial capital investment of 500 € gives a rate of profit of 5 %. From year to year capital can grow at a rate of 5%, if all profits are invested or accumulated.

Marxian economics
In Marxian political economy, the rate of profit (r) would be measured as 

 r = (surplus value)/(capital invested).

where surplus value corresponds to unpaid labor in the production process or to profits, interest, and rent (property income).

See also

Capital accumulation
Internal rate of return
Okishio's theorem
Profit (accounting)
Profit (economics)
Rate of exploitation
Return on capital
Tendency of the rate of profit to fall

References

Marxist theory
Marxian economics
Profit
Rates
Yield (finance)